China FAW Group Corp., Ltd. (First Automobile Works) is a Chinese state-owned automobile manufacturer headquartered in Changchun, Jilin. Founded in 1953, it is currently the second largest of the "Big Four" state-owned car manufacturers of China, together with SAIC Motor, Dongfeng Motor Corporation and Changan Automobile.

The company produces and sells vehicles under its own branding, such as Hongqi, Bestune (Benteng) as well as under foreign-branded joint ventures such as FAW-Toyota and FAW-Volkswagen (Volkswagen, Audi).

Its principal products are automobiles, buses, light, medium and heavy-duty trucks, and auto parts. FAW became China's first automobile manufacturer when it unveiled the nation's first domestically produced passenger car, the Hongqi, in 1958.

The company has three publicly traded subsidiaries: FAW Car Co., Ltd., Tianjin FAW Xiali Automobile Co., Ltd., and Changchun FAWAY Automobile Components Co., Ltd..

History

First Automobile Works broke ground on its first factory in 1953 (the first year of the first five-year plan), and produced its first product, the Jiefang CA-10 truck (based on the Soviet ZIS-150) in 1956.

Soviet Russia lent assistance during these early years providing technical support, tooling, and production machinery. Before the first factory opened, 39 Chinese FAW employees traveled to the Stalin Truck Factory for instruction in truck production. Operations were conducted under Soviet direction, and the USSR is even credited with choosing Changchun as the location for the first FAW facility.

The Faw "winged 1" badge is derived from the Chinese 一汽 ("一" meaning "one" and "汽", from "汽车" meaning "automotive") and depicts a hawk spreading its wings, 一 (1). The logo was introduced in 1964.

First Automobile Works initially made only commercial trucks, but started producing passenger cars in 1958. These vehicles, Hongqi luxury sedans, were the first domestically produced Chinese automobiles. Made primarily for the party elite, the design changed little over their thirty-year production run. Following this, FAW's Audi products are the traditionally favoured choice for ranking Chinese state officials.

In 1992, the name First Automobile Works was changed to FAW Group Corporation.

Though FAW was the fourth Chinese automaker to take on Western partners, its early joint venture with Volkswagen in 1990 saw it become the second Chinese auto company to develop a strong cooperative relationship with a foreign counterpart. SAIC was the first, in 1984 and also with VW.

Volkswagen was the first foreign partner for FAW, but others soon followed. The company acquired 50% ownership of Tianjin Automotive Xiali in September, 2002, and renamed the brand FAW Tianjin. As a result, FAW ended up with Toyota as a foreign joint venture partner. FAW established a joint venture with General Motors in 2009 and has joint ventures with a handful of other foreign companies as well.

The company produced more than 1.5 million vehicles in 2008, and in 2009 it was the largest machinery corporation and the second largest auto manufacturer in China. In 2010, the 2.56 million units sold made it the third most-productive vehicle maker in China that year, and one of its offerings, the FAW Xiali, was the 7th most-purchased car in China in 2010. It produced 2.6 million vehicles in 2011, the third-largest output of any China-based company. While it retained its third place rank, the number of whole vehicles produced in 2012 slowed to 2.3 million. Passenger cars made up a relatively scant 64% of total production that year.

On July 2021, FAW transfered 49% of the shares of FAW Haima to Hainan Development Holdings Co., Ltd. (Hainan Holdings) at no charge. Haima Automobile holds 51% of the shares in FAW Haima, while Hainan Holdings hold 49% of the shares.

Brands and products
FAW sells products under at least ten different brands including its own. The following is an incomplete list.

Hongqi
Key models include:
Hongqi L5
Hongqi LS7 
Hongqi H5 
Hongqi H9
Hongqi HS5 
Hongqi HS7 
Hongqi E-HS9 
Hongqi HQ9

Jiefang 

Established as a subsidiary on 18 January 2003, it is a producer of medium and heavy trucks. With two subsidiaries of its own, Qingdao Truck Division and FAW Trading Company, it is one make of Jiefang branded trucks. As of 2003, FAW Jiefang Truck utilizes production lines dating from 1956.

Bestune (formerly Besturn)
Established on August 18, 2006, It may also be known as Ben Teng.

Key models include:

Bestune B70
Bestune T99
Bestune T77
Bestune T55
Bestune E01

Other FAW Brands 

 FAW Haima (devested), founded in January 1992 as Hainan Mazda Motor, a joint venture between the Hainan provincial government and Mazda to produce Mazda models for sale in China. In 2006, Mazda's share of Hainan Mazda was acquired by FAW Group, and the company became a subsidiary of FAW. On July 2021, FAW transfered 49% of the shares of FAW Haima to Hainan Development Holdings Co., Ltd. (Hainan Holdings) at no charge. 

 FAW Tianjin: Junpai, Huali (discontinued), Xiali (discontinued), Jiaxing (discontinued)
 FAW Jilin, a maker of mini-vehicles, small trucks and vans under the Senia and Jiabao brands.
SiTech (discontinued), a brand that focuses on electric vehicles. Established in 2018 with the first car called SiTech DEV1 launched.
 Pengxiang
 Shenli
 Yuan Zheng
 Baolong
Oley (discontinued),  a newer brand that was targeting young buyers. Defunct in 2015.

Joint ventures

FAW-Toyota 

Created in 2003, FAW operates this joint venture with Japanese automaker Toyota through Tianjin FAW. Key subsidiaries include:

Guangzhou Toyota Motor Co
Operates a passenger car production base in the Nansha Economic Development District of Guangzhou, Guangdong province.
Sichuan FAW Toyota Motor Co
Operates a passenger car production base in the Chenghua District of Sichuan province and another in Changchun, Jilin province. As of 2008, its 10,000 units/year capacity production base in Changchun makes the Toyota Prius and the Toyota Land Cruiser. The other production base it controls may make buses.

Tianjin FAW Toyota Engine Co Ltd
This equally owned joint venture with Toyota makes engines at its production bases in the Xiqing District of Tianjin and at the Tianjin Economic and Technological Development Zone. Combined, both bases can produce 440,000 units annually.

FAW Toyota Changchun Engine Co Ltd
Making engines at a 130,000 units/year capacity production base in the Changchun Economic and Technology Development Zone, this equally owned joint venture was established in 2004.

FAW-Volkswagen Automobile Co Ltd 

 
Established in 1991, this large-scale automobile manufacturer is a joint venture between FAW Group and Volkswagen AG which, as of 2003, have ownership stakes of 60% and 40%, respectively. It manufactures Audi and Volkswagen-branded automobiles for sale in China.

Chengdu FAW Co Ltd
This subsidiary of FAW's joint venture with VW controls production bases in Chengdu, Sichuan province.

FAW-GM 

A joint venture with General Motors that mainly produces Jiefang light-duty trucks, this JV includes the Harbin Light Vehicle and FAW Hongta Yunnan factories.

FAW-GM Light Duty Commercial Vehicle Co Ltd
This joint venture with General Motors mainly produces Jiefang light-duty trucks.

Silk-FAW Automotive 

This joint venture with US based design firm Silk EV produces high end luxury hybrid sports cars.

Subsidiaries and divisions

FAW has at least 28 wholly owned subsidiaries and controlling shares in 18 partially owned subsidiaries. These include the wholly owned subsidiaries FAW Jiefang Truck Co Ltd and FAW Bus and Coach Co Ltd, and the publicly traded FAW Car Co Ltd, Tianjin FAW Xiali Automobile Co Ltd, and Changchun FAWAY Automobile Components Co Ltd.

The following is an incomplete list.

Vehicle-producing Divisions

Chengdu FAW Automobile Co Ltd 
Chengdu FAW produces Huaxi brand light and medium buses based on the Toyota Coaster. Originally the Sichuan Bus Company, it became a partially-owned subsidiary in 2002 after acquisition by FAW.

FAW Car Co Ltd 
 Created in 1997 from the merger of Changchun Gear Factory, the FAW No. 2 Engine Factory, the FAW No. 2 Car Factory, and the former FAW No. 1 Car Factory, this publicly listed subsidiary produces cars, transmissions, and engines. It has a production base in western Changchun, Jilin province.

FAW Bus and Coach 
Founded in 1959, it produces buses sold under the Taihu brand.

FAW Hongta Yunnan Automobile Co Ltd 
Created in 1997 when FAW purchased a controlling interest in Hongta Yunnan Automobile Co Ltd, this subsidiary company, as of 2003, produces 1/2-3 ton pickups and light trucks as well as license-built Daihatsu models. This factory was included in the FAW-GM Light Duty Commercial Vehicle joint venture.

FAW Jilin Automobile Co Ltd 

Founded in 1980, this company became a wholly owned subsidiary of FAW Group in either 1987 or March 1991. It manufactures compact trucks and buses originally based on Suzukis. More recently, Jilin participated in a five-year-long joint venture with Daihatsu.

FAW Passenger Vehicle Co 
As of 2012, this company has two factories and some of the products it produces carry the Oley brand.

FAW Sichuan Automotive Co Ltd 
Established in 1997, this part-owned subsidiary designs, produces, and markets medium and heavy truck bodies, wheels, and components for both FAW and other manufacturers.

The Harbin Light Vehicle Factory 
Established in 1965, this FAW Group subsidiary made military vehicles until partnering with FAW in the 1990s. It has since produced pickups, Jiefang trucks, and mini-vehicles (small trucks and vans that see commercial use). This factory was included in the FAW-GM Light Duty Commercial Vehicle joint venture.

Other divisions 

 The 9th Industrial Machinery Design and Research Institute -  Wholly owned subsidiary since 1958, responsible for production base design.
 FAW Forging Co Ltd - Producing die and hand-forged auto parts, this subsidiary was established on 31 May 2000.
 FAW Foundry Co Ltd - This wholly owned subsidiary produces cast auto parts including engine blocks.
 FAW Jiaxin Heat Treatment and Electroplate Technology Co Ltd - This wholly owned subsidiary designs and manufactures complete heat treatment and electroplating systems.
 FAW Qiming Information Technology Co Ltd - Established in 2000, this subsidiary company is responsible for GPS research and development, business development, sales and marketing, after sales support, and system integration. A vehicle-monitoring division of its GPS research & development arm used a system purchased from Avaya to, "monitor over 3,000 vehicles throughout China".
 FAW Tool Co Ltd - This wholly owned subsidiary specializes in development and production of non-standard tools for automotive manufacture.
 FAW Tool and Die Co Ltd - Manufacturing automotive dies is the main responsibility of this wholly owned subsidiary.
 Dalian Diesel Engine Co - Produces engines for commercial trucks, construction equipment, and agricultural machinery. In 1986, 35 years after its inception, this company became a wholly owned subsidiary of FAW. 
 FAW Import and Export Corporation (FAWIE) - Established as a subsidiary in 1984, FAWIE is the international sales and marketing division of FAW Group. Overseas joint ventures and technical cooperation with foreign countries are also within its remit. This subsidiary has established overseas production facilities in Pakistan, South Africa, Tanzania, Ukraine, Vietnam, and Russia.

Minor joint ventures 

 Chengdu Araco Automobile Trim Part Co Ltd - This joint venture with Japan's ARACO produces interior trim parts.
 FAWER Automotive Component Co Ltd - Operated with American auto-parts maker Visteon, produces air-conditioning units at a facility in the Changchun Automotive Development Zone
 FAW Bharat Forging Co Ltd - A joint venture with India's Bharat Forge Ltd, it manufactures forged automotive components for passenger cars, buses, and commercial vehicles as well as forged products for the railway, mining, steel, and petroleum industries.
 FAW Huali (Tianjin) Automobile Co Ltd - A joint venture with Tianjin Automotive Industry (Group) Co Ltd that, since 2003, has manufactured Daihatsu models sold under the brand name Dario. As of 2008, it continues to produce Daihatsu models, has a 10,000 units per year production capacity, and is majority owned by FAW with a 75% ownership stake.
 Wuhu FAW Yangzi Automobile Co Ltd - This joint venture with Yangzi Group and Wuhu Automotive Industry Company manufactures trucks, custom bus chassis, and medium-size buses.
 Changchun Fawer-Johnson - A joint venture between FAW Sichuan and Johnson Controls, it produces a wide range of interior components including automotive seats and trim.

Production bases and facilities
FAW has production bases located in 14 provinces throughout China including the provinces of Guangdong, Hainan, Heilongjiang, Jilin, Liaoning, Shandong, Sichuan, and Yunnan. Non-provincial locales include Pudong and Tianjin.

Changchun

FAW headquarters are located in Changchun, Jilin province, and operations here include an R&D and test center. Additionally, FAW has two production bases here—one produces for the FAW-Volkswagen joint venture and the other makes self-branded autos.

Chengdu
An unfinished production base in the Longquan Economic Development Zone in Chengdu, Sichuan province, replaces an older Sichuan base and will produce passenger cars for a FAW-Toyota joint venture, Tianjin FAW Toyota Motor Co Ltd, when it is completed in 2010.

FAW Jiefang Truck Co Ltd also has a production base here.

Another site in Chengdu produces cars for FAW-Volkswagen, and a second VW production base is, as of 2009, scheduled to be built in the city.

Dalian

The Dalian division of FAW Bus and Coach Co Ltd manufactures Jiefang and Yuan Zheng brand medium and large-size buses in a production base in Dalian, Liaoning province. An unfinished bus production base in at the Dalian Economic & Technological Development Zone is expected to be complete in mid-2010 and will produce hybrid buses.

Another Dalian base produces engines for commercial trucks, construction equipment, and agricultural machinery.

Foshan
As of 2010, 150,000 units/year production capacity FAW-VW production base will soon be built in this Guangdong province city.

Hainan
Located in the sunny, southern vacation spot of Hainan island and built in 1958, Hainan Island Test Grounds is an auto testing site that includes a test track. FAW Hainan Automobile Co Ltd operates FAW's southernmost production facility here.

A production base on the island manufactures license-built Mazdas.

Harbin
A planned production base at the Aviation & Automobile Development Zone (Pingfang Development Zone) in the city of Harbin, Heilongjiang province, will see completion in December 2010 and produce light trucks.

Shanghai
FAW Jiefang Truck Co Ltd has a production base in Pudong New Area in Shanghai.

Tianjin
Plants No. 1, 2, and 3 in the city of Tianjin produce automobiles for the FAW-Toyota joint venture Tianjin FAW Toyota Motor Co Ltd. Plant No. 1 is in Yangliuqing Town, Xiqing District, and plants No. 2 and 3 are located in the Tianjin Economic and Technological Development Zone and began production in 2007. Tianjin FAW Toyota Motor Co Ltd also has an engine plant in Tianjin.

Qingdao
A FAW Jiefang Truck Co Ltd medium, heavy, and severe-duty truck production base is located in Qingdao, Shandong province.

Sales

Export sales 

While primarily manufacturing products for sale in its home market, FAW began exports to foreign countries in 1957 with the sale of three commercial trucks to a businessperson in Jordan. FAW has shipped its products to more than eighty nations, including Egypt, Iraq, Kenya, Mexico, Myanmar, Pakistan, Russia, South Africa, Iran, Zimbabwe and Uruguay.

NAZ-Nakhchivan Automobile Plant has assembled FAW cars in Nakhchivan, Azerbaijan, since 2020.

See also

List of automobile manufacturers of China
Automotive industry in China

References

External links

50th anniversary commemorative brochure

 
Truck manufacturers of China
Bus manufacturers of China
Auto parts suppliers of China
Multinational companies headquartered in China
Vehicle manufacturing companies established in 1953
Companies based in Changchun
Chinese brands
Chinese companies established in 1953
Government-owned companies of China